Volcano Golf Course is an unincorporated community and census-designated place (CDP) in Hawaii County, Hawaii, United States. It is directly north of Kilauea on the island of Hawaii and is bordered to the north and east by the community of Volcano and to the south by Hawaii Volcanoes National Park.

The community was first listed as a CDP prior to the 2020 census.

Demographics

References 

Census-designated places in Hawaii County, Hawaii
Census-designated places in Hawaii
Unincorporated communities in Hawaii County, Hawaii